Jennifer McEvoy is an English actress who is best known for playing Mrs. Peel in the 
ninth episode Goodwill to All Men  of the third series of the period drama Upstairs, Downstairs (22 December 1973). 

She is also known for playing Gillian Baker in the twenty-third episode  Why Baker Died  of the sixth series of the British television series  No Hiding Place  (21 September 1964).  

In 2007, she played a neighbour in the second episode Mortgage of the second series of the British television series  Not Going Out  (9 July 2008).

References

External links

English film actresses
English television actresses
Year of birth missing (living people)
Living people